Red Lake Peak (elevation ) is believed to be the vantage point from which John C. Fremont and Charles Preuss made the first recorded sighting of Lake Tahoe by Europeans in February 1844 as Fremont's exploratory expedition made a desperate crossing of the Sierra Nevada through what is now Carson Pass on their way to obtain provisions at Sutter's Fort. The peak lies just north of the pass and generally northwest of the small lake east of the pass for which the peak is named. Lake Tahoe and Stevens Peak are visible to the north from the peak. Elephants Back and Round Top can be seen to the south.

Climate
According to the Köppen climate classification system, Red Lake Peak is located in an alpine climate zone. Most weather fronts originate in the Pacific Ocean, and travel east toward the Sierra Nevada mountains. As fronts approach, they are forced upward by the peaks (orographic lift), causing them to drop their moisture in the form of rain or snowfall onto the range.

Gallery

References

External links
 
  Information on the 1844 route followed by Fremont and Charles Preuss.
 

Mountains of Alpine County, California
Mountains of the Sierra Nevada (United States)
Mountains of Northern California